Sandesneben was an Amt ("collective municipality") in the district of Lauenburg, in Schleswig-Holstein, Germany. Its seat was in Sandesneben. In January 2008, it was merged with the Amt Nusse to form the Amt Sandesneben-Nusse.

The Amt Sandesneben consisted of the following municipalities (population in 2005 between brackets):

Former Ämter in Schleswig-Holstein